Catherine Heseltine (born 1978) is a British activist. She was elected as the CEO of Muslim Public Affairs Committee UK, a Muslim pressure group that opposes Zionism and Islamophobia. She has appeared regularly in newspapers and on television discussing issues impacting the British Muslim community as well as encouraging British Muslims to get involved in mainstream politics and to engage with the community.

Early life
Heseltine grew up in North London. In 1998, at age 20, she married Syed Hossein whom she met at sixth form. They married while both were at university and she converted to Islam. The marriage broke down and resulted in a divorce after seven years.

Career
On GMTV, while discussing the controversy around comments made by Archbishop of Canterbury about shariah law and its implications on divorce, Heseline said "I wanted the divorce, and it was a very simple process. It was actually a lot easier for me to get an Islamic divorce than the expensive, and somewhat time-consuming process through the English courts".  She had assumed the name Hossein until her divorce.

Personal life
On 9 August 2010, Heseltine married Muhammad Ali, a Bangladeshi who moved to Manchester with his family when he was three years old. They have two children.

Involvement with MPACUK
With her work at MPACUK, Heseltine was ranked by Time Out at position 17 in London's 100 top movers and shakers 2006.

Heseltine used to be a nursery teacher until elected as the CEO of MPACUK in 2010.

Heseltine joined MPACUK because she believed it would help in "empowering Muslims in mainstream politics and media, dealing with Islamophobia" and lead campaign against "discrimination against women in mosques, poverty and the situation in Palestine".

References

1978 births
Date of birth missing (living people)
Living people
English Muslims
English activists
English women activists
British Muslim activists
Converts to Islam
People from Chelsea, London